Der Internist (The Internist) is a monthly German language medical journal published by Springer Science+Business Media. In 2007, it was ranked among the largest German scientific journals in terms of revenue.

Abstracting and indexing 
The journal is abstracted and indexed in:

According to the Journal Citation Reports, Der Internist has a 2012 impact factor of 0.329.

References

External links 
 

Springer Science+Business Media academic journals
German-language journals
Monthly journals
Publications established in 1960
General medical journals